Patrick G. Lyons (born c. 1975) is an American college athletics administrator.  He has been the athletic director at Seton Hall University since February 2011. 

A native of Providence, Rhode Island, Lyons attended Iona College and played for the men's ice hockey and golf teams. He led all NCAA Division I players in goals per game during the 1995–96 hockey season, was captain of the golf team, and received the Joseph O'Connell award as the school's outstanding student athlete.  He was the athletic director at Iona from 2005 to 2011 and also coached the golf team from 1998 to 2002.

References

Year of birth missing (living people)
1970s births
Living people
Iona Gaels athletic directors
Iona Gaels men's golf coaches
Iona Gaels men's golfers
Iona Gaels men's ice hockey players
Seton Hall Pirates athletic directors